Mecyclothorax gourvesioides is a species of ground beetle in the subfamily Psydrinae. It was described by Perrault in 1988.

References

gourvesioides
Beetles described in 1988